Rendy Siregar (born 14 September 1986 in Jakarta) is an Indonesian professional footballer who plays as a full-back for Liga 2 club Sriwijaya.

Club career 
He previously played for Persiba Balikpapan. In December 2014, he signed with Gresik United.

International career
In 2009, Rendy Siregar represented the Indonesia U-23, in the 2009 Southeast Asian Games.

Honours

Club
Sriwijaya
 Indonesian Community Shield: 2010
 Indonesian Inter Island Cup: 2010

References

External links 
 
 Rendy Siregar at Liga Indonesia

1986 births
Association football defenders
Living people
Indonesian Muslims
People of Batak descent
Indonesian footballers
Liga 1 (Indonesia) players
Liga 2 (Indonesia) players
Indonesian Premier Division players
Persikota Tangerang players
Persid Jember players
PSM Makassar players
Sriwijaya F.C. players
Persela Lamongan players
Persiba Balikpapan players
Gresik United players
Madura United F.C. players
Mitra Kukar players
Sportspeople from Jakarta
People from Jakarta
Indonesia youth international footballers